Thomas Scott Garrett (born July 22, 1956) is an American politician. He served on the Lynchburg, Virginia city council from 2006 until 2010, when he entered the Virginia House of Delegates, where until 2020 he represented the 23rd district, made up of parts of Amherst and Bedford Counties and Lynchburg. He is a member of the Republican Party.

Garrett received an M.D. degree from the University of Virginia in 1984, and has been a practicing general surgeon in the Lynchburg area since 1989.

Electoral history

See also
Lynchburg, Virginia
2009 Virginia elections

References

External links

1956 births
Living people
Republican Party members of the Virginia House of Delegates
Virginia city council members
University of Virginia School of Medicine alumni
American surgeons
Methodists from Virginia
Politicians from Lynchburg, Virginia
21st-century American politicians
20th-century American physicians
21st-century American physicians